Wizards: Magical Tales from the Masters of Modern Fantasy is a fantasy anthology edited by American writers Jack Dann and Gardner Dozois. It was first published in hardcover by Berkley Books in 2008 and in paperback by Ace Books in 2008.

Contents
The book has a short preface by the editors.

"The Witch's Headstone" by Neil Gaiman
"Holly and Iron" by Garth Nix
"Color Vision" by Mary Rosenblum
"The Ruby Incomparable" by Kage Baker
"A Fowl Tale" by Eoin Colfer
"Slipping Sideways Through Eternity" by Jane Yolen
"The Stranger’s Hands" by Tad Williams
"Naming Day" by Patricia A. McKillip
"Winter’s Wife" by Elizabeth Hand
"A Diorama of the Infernal Regions, or The Devil's Ninth Question" by Andy Duncan
"Barrens Dance" by Peter S. Beagle
"Stone Man" by Nancy Kress
"The Manticore Spell" by Jeffrey Ford
"Zinder" by Tanith Lee
"Billy and the Wizard"' by Terry Bisson
"The Magikkers" by Terry Dowling
"The Magic Animal" by Gene Wolfe
"Stonefather" by Orson Scott Card

Recognition
The book was nominated for the 2008 World Fantasy Award and the 2008 Shirley Jackson Award for Best Anthology.

Notes

Fantasy anthologies
2007 anthologies
Jack Dann and Gardner Dozois Ace anthologies
Berkley Books books
Ace Books books